Phenomena is the fourth studio album by American metalcore band Within the Ruins. It was released on July 22, 2014. The track list for the album was revealed on June 10, 2014, along with the release of the first single "Gods Amongst Men". The album sold 4,067 copies in the United States in its first week and debuted at #72 on the Billboard 200.

Composition
This is the first album where guitarist Joe Cocchi uses a 7-string guitar, utilizing bass guitar strings in order to adopt an unconventionally low tuning and vastly increase the low range of the instrument.

In a 2014 interview with Loudwire, Joe Cocchi noted that parts of the instrumental "Enigma" reference themes from Super Mario Bros. and also Inspector Gadget.

Track listing

Personnel
Within the Ruins
 Tim Goergen – vocals
 Joe Cocchi – guitars, production, engineering
 Andrew Tate – bass
 Kevin McGuill – drums

Additional personnel
 Josh Wickman – production, engineering, mixing, mastering, vocal engineering, vocal production
 Jason Suecof – production, mixing
 Cameron Gray – illustrations, artwork
 Sean Marlowe – art direction, design
 Jeremy Saffer – photography

Charts

References 

2014 albums
Within the Ruins albums
E1 Music albums